A sports coach is a person coaching in sport, involved in the direction, instruction and training of a sports team or athlete.

History 
The original sense of the word coach is that of a horse-drawn carriage, deriving ultimately from the Hungarian city of Kocs where such vehicles were first made. Students at the University of Oxford in the early nineteenth century used the slang word to refer to a private tutor who would drive a less able student through his examinations just like horse driving.

Britain took the lead in upgrading the status of sports in the 19th century. For sports to become professionalized, "coacher" had to become established. It gradually professionalized in the Victorian era and the role was well established by 1914. In the First World War, military units sought out the coaches to supervise physical conditioning and develop morale-building teams.

Effectiveness 
John Wooden had a philosophy of coaching that encouraged planning, organization, and understanding, and that knowledge was important but not everything when being an effective coach. Traditionally coaching expertise or effectiveness has been measured by win–loss percentage, satisfaction of players, or years of coaching experience, but like in teacher expertise those metrics are highly ambiguous. Coaching expertise or effectiveness describes good coaching, which looks at coaching behaviour, dispositions, education, experience, and knowledge.

A widely used definition of effective coaching is "the consistent application of integrated professional, interpersonal, and intrapersonal knowledge, to improve athletes competence, confidence, connection, and character in specific coaching contexts".

Knowledge 
Coaches require descriptive knowledge and procedural knowledge that relate to all aspects of coaching, with expert coaches using tacit knowledge more freely. Teachers knowledge has been categorized, like coaches knowledge with various terms being used. Many categories falling under content knowledge, pedagogical knowledge, pedagogical-content knowledge. When considering the need to build relationships with others and athletes, interpersonal knowledge has been included. Then when considering professional development requiring the skills to learn from experience while utilizing reflective practice, intrapersonal knowledge has been included.

It is rare in professional sport for a team not to hire a former professional player, but playing and coaching have different knowledge bases. The combination of professional, interpersonal, and intrapersonal knowledge can lead to good thinking habits, maturity, wisdom, and capacity to make reasonable judgements.

Professionalism 
The subject, sport, curricular, and pedagogical knowledge all fall under this category of professional coaches knowledge. Including the "ologies" of sports science like; sport psychology, sport biomechanics, sport nutrition, exercise physiology, motor control, critical thinking, sociology, strength and conditioning, and sporting tactics, with all the associated sub areas of knowledge. This category of knowledge is what most coach education has been focused on  but this alone is not enough to be an effective coach.

Coaching is not just about sport specific skills  and education, especially when taking a holistic approach. Keeping sports people safe, and healthy  while participating are responsibilities of a coach as well as awareness of social factors like the relative age effect.

Interpersonality 
Much of coaching involves interacting with players, staff, community, opposition, and then family members in youth sport. The relationships built in a sports team influence the social interactions which can affect player performance and development, fan culture, and in professional sport, financial backing. Effective coaches have knowledge that helps in all social contexts to make the best of each situation, with the coach athlete relationship. being one of the most crucial to get right.

Excellent communication skills are imperative for coaches in order to provide their athletes with the adequate skills, knowledge and mental as well as tactical ability.

Intrapersonality 
A coaches ability to improve relies on professional development in continued learning which uses a combination of evaluation and reflective practice. Their recognition of personal ethical views and disposition are also elements of intrapersonal knowledge. The understanding of oneself and ability to use introspection and reflection are skills that take time to develop, using deliberate practice in each changing context. Coaching expertise requires this knowledge much like teachers  as each experience can confirm or contradict a prior belief in player performance. The internal and external framing of a coaches role can impact their reflection, suggesting perspective can be a limitation promoting the idea of a coaching community for feedback.

Athlete outcomes 
The coaching behavior assessment system has been used  to show that coaching knowledge and behavior have significant influence on participants psychological profile affecting self-esteem, motivation, satisfaction, attitudes, perceived competence, and performance. For a coach to be seen as effective, the people they work with should be improving, with expert coaches being able to sustain that over an extended period of time. There are various areas of development that can be categorized, which was first done with a 5 C's model: competence, confidence, connection, character and compassion  and was then later shortened to a 4 C's model by combining character and compassion.

People's competence can relate to their sport-specific technical and tactical skills, performance skills, improved health and fitness, and overall training habits. Their confidence relating to an internal sense of overall positive self-worth. Having a good connections is the positive bonds and social relationships with people inside and outside of the sporting context. Then character is respect for the sport and other participating showing good levels of morality, integrity, empathy, and responsibility.

The competence of a person is linked to leadership and centered around becoming a self-reliant member of a sports team and society in the coaching context. Competencies have guided much of sport psychology supporting positive youth development.

The self-determination theory suggests an environment that supports autonomous decision making, can help develop competence, confidence, and connection to others affecting motivation. Effective coaches therefore create supportive environments  while building good relationships with the people they coach.

Support staff 
In professional sports, a coach is usually supported by one or more assistant coaches and a specialist team including sports scientists. The staff may include coordinators, a strength and conditioning coach, sport psychologist, physiotherapist, nutritionist, biomechanist, or sports analyst.

Context 
The sport, environment, and context of coaching changes just like teaching. It is critical to understand the differences in sport  with recreational, developmental, and elite have been 3 suggested categories. This has been reduced to participation and performance by some. These different coaching context alter the trajectories of long term athlete development, affecting the prescription of training patterns and management of social influences 

When integrating the suggested participation and performance contexts with age, 4 categories have been suggested to represent the various coaching contexts. The sampling years which are participation coaches for children. The recreational years which are participation coaches for adolescents and adults. The specializing years which are performance coaches for young adolescents. Then the investment years which are the coaches for older adolescents and adults.

Association football 

In association football, the roles of a coach can vary depending on the level of seniority they are coaching at, the professional level that they're coaching at, and the country they are coaching in, amongst others. In youth football, the duties of a coach is primarily to aid in the development of technical skills. Additional skills that are important for a coach to help youth players develop is motor skills, stamina and the ability to read the game of play accordingly.

A solid foundation of tactical awareness is imperative for youth players to develop, because by the time they reach senior level (aged 18 and over), they are expected to know the tactical basis of the game - first team coaches at senior level do not actively teach tactics, they mainly just implement them. Therefore, youth coaches need to have a solid understanding of the tactics of the game, so that they can facilitate, as a pedagogue, for their players' growth also on the tactical level.

In professional football, the role of the coach or trainer is focused on the training and development of a club's first team. This means that the head coach is responsible for the first team strategy, development, training session schedule and player development. The head coach is accompanied by one or more assistant coaches, and is also assisted by medical staff and athletic trainers. A first team coach at a professional level is expecting of players to already be well-versed into the (general) tactics of football, so that he or she can instead focus on implementing their version of football tactics (style of play) into the team.

In English football, the director of a professional football team is commonly awarded the position of manager, a role that combines the duties of coach and sporting director.

All coaches of association football teams need to carefully consider the tactical ability and skill level of their teams when selecting tactics and strategy for games as well as practice.

United Kingdom 

Sports coaching in the UK follows a highly structured pattern in principle, but is delivered by a workforce which is largely volunteer-based. Recognising the pivotal role played by coaches in increasing participation and performance in sport, each of the UK's Home Country Sports Councils has a coaching strategy aligned to their overall strategy.

In June 2008, the Sports Councils together with the national governing bodies of sport (NGBs) formally adopted the UK Coaching Framework at the UK Coaching Summit in Coventry.

More than thirty sports have their coach education programmes endorsed as meeting the standards of the UK Coaching Certificate (UKCC) as an indication of quality assurance. Typically, such programmes classify coaches within Levels 1–4, with Level 2 being the minimum standard for someone to coach unaccompanied. Coach education programmes are usually organised centrally by the NGBs but delivered locally to meet the needs of volunteer coaches. For anyone wanting to become a coach in a particular sport, the NGB website provides the first point of contact for further information.

Each of the counties in England has a County Sports Partnership (CSP) funded by Sport England which supports local coaching networks to bring coaches from different sports together to share best practice and gain further continuing professional development (CPD). Similar arrangements exist across Northern Ireland, Scotland and Wales.

The safeguarding and protection of children in sport has been a major focus for sports coach UK and the NSPCC for many years. Short workshops on safeguarding are the most popular of all CPD sessions organised by sports coach UK and delivered across the CSP network.

The UK government, through DCMS, highlighted the need for detailed research into sports coaching patterns. As a result, major tracking studies have been completed. These confirm that three in every four coaches are volunteers, typically giving up three hours a week to coach their sport. Fewer than 5% of coaches in the UK are full-time professionals, in stark contrast to the USA.

Cricket 

Coaches have much less of a role in cricket matches than in other sports, with the team captain making most strategic decisions for their team. During the game, cricket coaches generally focus on occasionally sending out messages or feedback to the team, especially during breaks in the play such as time-outs; otherwise, most coaches have an auxiliary role in helping the players practice, with each one generally specializing in improving the batting and bowling skills of the players. In recent years, fielding coaches have received more priority, as the shorter formats of the game have made good fielding more valuable.

United States 

All major U.S. collegiate sports have associations for their coaches to engage in professional development activities, but some sports' professional coaches have less formal associations, without developing into a group resembling a union in the way that athletic players in many leagues have.

U.S. collegiate coaching contracts require termination without the payment of a settlement if the coach is found to be in serious violation of named rules, usually with regard to the recruiting or retention of players in violation of amateur status.

The NFL head coaches have an association, called NFL Coaches Association (NFLCA), which includes all the coaches in the NFL, except New England Patriots head coach Bill Belichick.

Many coaching contracts allow the termination of the coach with little notice and without specific cause, usually in the case of high-profile coaches with the payment of a financial settlement. Coaching is a very fickle profession, and a reversal of the team's fortune often finds last year's "Coach of the Year" to be seeking employment in the next. Many coaches are former players of the sport themselves, and coaches of professional sports teams are sometimes retired players.

On some teams, the principal coach (usually referred to as the head coach) has little to do with the development of details such as techniques of play or placement of players on the playing surface, leaving this to assistants while concentrating on larger issues such as recruitment and organizational development.

Successful coaches often become as well or even better-known than the athletes they coach, and in recent years have come to command high salaries and have agents of their own to negotiate their contracts with the teams. Often the head coach of a well-known team has his or her own radio and television programs and becomes the primary "face" associated with the team.

Both the collegiate and professional-level coaches may have contracts for millions of dollars a year. The head coach at the professional level has more time to devote to tactics and playbooks, which are combed over by staff that are usually paid more than at the college level. The pro level head coaching, due to the extensive time on the road and long hours, is a very stressful job. Since the money is good at high levels, many coaches retire in their early fifties. Also, professional staffs are not limited in the number of assistants which can be hired, NCAA Division I FBS teams are limited to ten full-time assistant coaches.

Many factors are part of NFL coaches' contracts. These involve the NFL's $11 billion as the highest-revenue sport in North America, topping Major League Baseball's (MLB) $7 billion, while holding a non-taxpaying exemption that the MLB does not. The unusual distinction of being a tax-exempt multibillion-dollar corporation and a tax-exempt monopoly that can move teams from one city to another, is combined with stadiums sometimes built through tax-free borrowing by the cities, which every American taxpayer pays for in public subsidies. The NFL's coaches are the highest-paid professional coaches with professional football topping the list in Forbes' highest-paid sports coaches. Bill Belichick was in the top spot for the second year in a row with no MLB or National Hockey League coaches making the list.

Another major element of NFL coaches' contracts, negotiated between coaches, teams and owners, are NFL-demanded provisions in the coaches' employment contracts, that authorize the employing NFL teams to withhold part of a coach's salary when league operations are suspended, such as during lockouts or television contract negotiations.

American baseball 

At baseball's professional level in North America, the person who heads the coaching staff does not use the title of "head coach", but is instead called the field manager. Baseball "coaches" at that level are members of the coaching staff under the overall supervision of the manager, with each coach having a specialized role. The baseball field manager is essentially equivalent a head coach in other American professional sports leagues; player transactions are handled by the general manager. The term manager used without qualification almost always refers to the field manager, while the general manager is often called the GM.

At amateur levels, the terminology is more similar to that of other sports. The person known as the "manager" in professional leagues is generally called the "head coach" in amateur leagues; this terminology is standard in U.S. college baseball.

American football 
In American football, like many other sports, there are many coaches and assistant coaches. American football includes a head coach, an assistant head coach, an offensive coordinator, a defensive coordinator, a special teams coordinator, offensive and defensive line coaches, coaches for every position, and a strength and conditioning coach, among other positions.

See also 

 Head coach (American football)
 Fitness professional
 Manager (association football)
 Coach (baseball)
 Manager (baseball)
 Coach (basketball)
 Manager (Gaelic games)
 Coach (ice hockey)
 Player-coach
 Player-manager
 Coaching staff
 Coaching tree
 Coach of the Year
 Personal trainer
 Sports trainer
 Strength and conditioning coach

References 

 
Education and training occupations
Leadership positions in sports
Management occupations